The 1936 NFL Championship Game was the fourth championship game played in the National Football League (NFL). It took place on December 13 at Polo Grounds in New York City, making it the first NFL title game held on a neutral field.

The Eastern Division champion Boston Redskins (7–5) were the home team, but their owner George Preston Marshall, the Packers and the league mutually agreed to move the game from Fenway Park to the Polo Grounds due to low ticket sales in Boston. 

Several days after the game, Marshall announced he would move the team to his hometown of Washington, D.C. for the following season.

This was the first championship game for both the Redskins and the Western Division champion Green Bay Packers (10–1–1), who were favored. The Packers won 21–6 for their fourth NFL title, all under longtime head coach Curly Lambeau, having previously won league championships awarded by league standing in 1929, 1930, and 1931.

Scoring summary 
Sunday, December 13, 1936
Kickoff: 2 p.m. EST
First quarter
GB – Don Hutson 48-yard pass from Arnie Herber (Ernie Smith kick), 7–0 GB
Second quarter
BOS – Pug Rentner 2-yard run (kick failed), 7–6 GB
Third quarter
GB – Milt Gantenbein 8-yard pass from Herber (Smith kick), 14–6 GB
Fourth quarter
GB – Bob Monnett 2-yard run (Tiny Engebretsen kick), 21–6 GB

Officials
Referee: W.G. Crowell
Umpire: Bobby Cahn
Head Linesman: Maurice Meyer
Field Judge: William Halloran 

Players' shares
Each player on the winning Packer team received about $250, while Redskins received about $180 each.

References

NFL Championship Game
Green Bay Packers postseason
Boston Redskins postseason
Championship Game
National Football League Championship games
NFL Championship Game
Sports in Manhattan
American football competitions in New York City
NFL Championship Game
1930s in Manhattan
Washington Heights, Manhattan